José Veríssimo Dias de Matos (8 April 1857 – 2 December 1916) was a writer, educator, journalist, literary critic, and founding member of the Brazilian Academy of Letters.

Biography
José Veríssimo was born in Óbidos, Pará, the son of José Veríssimo de Matos and Ana Flora Dias de Matos. His early school-days were spent in Manaus and Belém. In 1869, he was sent to Rio de Janeiro to continue his studies, but had to return to Pará due to poor health. He then devoted himself zealously to journalism and teaching. In 1891, Veríssimo returned to Rio de Janeiro and took a position as professor in Colégio Pedro II. For some time (1895–1899), concurrently with his scholarly labors, he edited the famous Revista Brasileira.

Works
 Primeiras Páginas (1878).
 Emilio Littré (1882).
 Diversos: Cenas da Vida Amazônica (1886). 
 Questão de Limites: Pará e Amazonas (1889).
 Estudos Brasileiros (2 Vols., 1889–1904). 
 Educação Nacional (1890). 
 A Amazônia: Aspectos Econômicos (1892). 
 A Pesca na Amazônia (1895). 
 A Instrução Pública e a Imprensa (1900).
 Estudos de Literatura (6 vols., 1901–1907).
 Homens e Coisas Estrangeiras (3 Vols., 1902–1910). 
 Que é Literatura e outros Escritos (1907). 
 Interesses da Amazônia (1915).
 História da Literatura Brasileira (1916).
 Letras e Literatos (1936).

Selected articles
 "A Revolução Chilena e a Questão da América Latina", Revista Brasileira, Vol. 111, 1895, pp. 108–121.
 "Gregório de Mattos," Revista da Academia Brazileira de Letras, Vol. 2, 1912, p. 27–44.

Notes

Further reading
 Barbosa, João Alexandre. (1974). A Tradição do Impasse: Linguagem da Crítica e Crítica da Linguagem em José Veríssimo. São Paulo: Ática.
 Barbosa, João Alexandre. (1996). "Uma Introdução a José Veríssimo." In: A Biblioteca Imaginária. Cotia: Atelie Editorial, pp. 173–221.
 Barbosa, João Alexandre. (2000). "José Veríssimo: Leitor de Estrangeiros," Literatura e Sociedade, No. 5, pp. 56–84.
 Carone, Edgard (1969). A Primeira República. Texto e Contexto: 1889-1930. São Paulo: Difel. 
 Lins, Álvaro (1944). Jornal de Crítica, 3ª Série. Rio de Janeiro: José Olympio.
 Martins, Wilson (1952). A Crítica Literária no Brasil. São Paulo: Depto. de Cultura.
 Montenegro, Olívio (1958). José Veríssimo: Crítica. Rio de Janeiro: Agir.
 Romero, Sílvio (1909). Zéverissimações Ineptas da Critica: Repulsas e Desabafos. Porto: Comércio do Porto. 
 Veríssimo, Ignácio José. (1966). José Veríssimo Visto por Dentro. Manaus: Edições Governo do Estado do Amazonas.

External links
 José Veríssimo: Pensamento Social e Etnografia da Amazônia (1877/1915)
 "Meio" e "Língua", Dois Conceitos na Crítica de José Veríssimo
 José Veríssimo: Enciclopédia Itaú Cultural
 Romero, Araripe, Veríssimo e a Recepção Crítica do Romance Machadiano

1857 births
1916 deaths
Brazilian literary critics
Brazilian journalists
Brazilian people of Portuguese descent
Members of the Brazilian Academy of Letters
People from Pará
19th-century Brazilian writers
20th-century Brazilian writers
19th-century journalists
20th-century journalists
Male journalists
19th-century Brazilian male writers